Fantasy fandom is a fandom and commonality of fans of the fantasy genre.

It revolves around popular media franchises belonging to the fantasy genre and can include collective fan works of these fantasy franchises and events that celebrate franchises of the genre as well as characters belonging to that genre.

Examples of fan clubs devoted to stories and franchises of fantasy and include Disneyana fanclub, and The Tolkien Society in appreciation of works by J. R. R. Tolkien.

In more recent times, the development of the Internet has also taken fandom communities online.

See also
Fantasy Fan, the first American magazine in the genre of fantasy and weird fiction.
World Fantasy Convention
Tolkien fandom
Harry Potter fandom
Shrek fandom
Science fiction fandom
Furry fandom
Lovecraft fandom

References

External links
The Communication of Fan Culture: The Impact of New Media on Science Fiction and Fantasy Fandom Georgia Institute of Technology

 
Nerd culture